Carletonite is a rare silicate mineral with formula KNa4Ca4(CO3)4Si8O18(F,OH)·(H2O).

It is a phyllosilicate and a member of the apophyllite group. Its tetragonal crystals are a translucent blue, white, colorless or pink with a vitreous to dull lustre. It has a density of 2.45 and a hardness of 4-4.5.

It was discovered by G.Y Chao and named for the school he attended, Carleton University of Ottawa. It was first described in 1969 for an occurrence at Mont Saint-Hilaire, Quebec. The type locality at Mont Saint–Hilaire is the only reported occurrence. 

It occurs in hornfels and siliceous marble xenoliths within and adjacent to a nepheline syenite intrusion. It occurs in association with quartz, narsarsukite, calcite, fluorite, ancylite, molybdenite, leucosphenite, lorenzenite, galena, albite, pectolite, apophyllite, leifite, microcline and arfvedsonite.

References 

Phyllosilicates
Carbonate minerals
Tetragonal minerals
Minerals in space group 127